Gabe Scholten (29 June 1921 – 23 February 1997) was a Dutch sprinter. He competed at the 1948 Summer Olympics in the 200 m and 4 × 100 m events and finished in sixth place in the relay. Two years earlier his team was fourth in the relay at the 1946 European Athletics Championships.

Competition record

References

1921 births
1997 deaths
Dutch male sprinters
Athletes (track and field) at the 1948 Summer Olympics
Olympic athletes of the Netherlands
Athletes from Amsterdam